Dehshal (also Romanized as Dehshāl) is a village in Dehshal Rural District, in the Central District of Astaneh-ye Ashrafiyeh County, Gilan Province, Iran. At the 2006 census, its population was 695, in 229 families.

References 

Populated places in Astaneh-ye Ashrafiyeh County